The Simony Act 1688 (1 Will & Mary c 16) is an Act of the Parliament of England.

This Act was partly in force in Great Britain at the end of 2010.

Section 2
This section, from "bee it" to "aforesaid that" was repealed by section 1(1) of, and Part I of the Schedule to, the Statute Law Revision Act 1888.

See also
Simony

References
Halsbury's Statutes,

External links
The Simony Act 1688, as amended from the National Archives.

Acts of the Parliament of England
1688 in law
1688 in England